Samba in Your Casa is the fourth studio album by British pop/jazz/soul/dance band Matt Bianco, released in 1991. It was their first long playing record for EastWest label, and came out one year after their first Greatest Hits album for WEA, the UK number 49 The Best of Matt Bianco, and three years after their third studio work, the UK number 23 Indigo, the latter including their UK number 11 dance smash hit double A-side single "Don't Blame It on That Girl/Wap-Bam-Boogie". Unlike their typically jazz and soul early works, the 1991 album was more oriented to Latin pop, dance, and electronic music, but did not achieve much commercial success in Europe, instead starting a loyal fan base for the group in Japan and Asia, though it was in fact well received in Germany too, one of the few European countries which never forgot Matt Bianco. The LP was mainly promoted by the single "Macumba", and the title track "Samba in Your Casa", which featured as a B side on the second single, a cover version of "What a Fool Believes", which did not get much airplay though - this item also included "Say It's Not Too Late", from the previous studio album by the band, the mentioned 1988 Indigo. The first single, instead, besides two different remix versions of "Macumba" by Bobby Summerfield, also contained a new remix of "Wap-Bam-Boogie" by mixmaster Phil Harding and Ian Curnow.

Track listing
All tracks composed by Mark Fisher and Mark Reilly, except where noted.
 "You're The Rhythm" - 4:21
 "Macumba" (Diaz Jr/Gil/Liminha/Mark Reilly/Velosa) - 4:21    
 "Let It Whip" (Leon "Ndugu" Chancler, Reggie Andrews) - 4:53   
 "Strange Town" - 4:16   
 "The Night Has Just Begun" - 3:53   
 "True Love" - 4:38   
 "What a Fool Believes" (Kenny Loggins, Michael McDonald) - 4:25     
 "Lady of My Mind" - 3:53   
 "You're the Rhythm (Brazil)" - 3:52       
 "Samba in Your Casa" - 4:50

Singles from the album
"Macumba"
 "Macumba" - 3.29
 "Macumba (Que Rumba Mix)" - 4.49 [remix by Bobby Summerfield]
 "Wap-Bam-Boogie (The Sok It to Me Mix)" - 6.32 [remix by Phil Harding & Ian Curnow]
 "Macumba (Dub Version)" - 4.54 [remix by Bobby Summerfield]

"What a Fool Believes"
 "What a Fool Believes" - 4.23
 "Say It's Not Too Late" - 4:56
 "Samba in Your Casa (Cashassa Mix)" - 5.20 [remixed by Bobby Summerfield]

Charts

Notes

External links
 Matt Bianco's detailed discography
 Amazon.com: cover art, track listing, reviews, and other details of the Samba in Your Casa album

1991 albums
Matt Bianco albums
East West Records albums